The Reality Club was a group of mostly New York City-based intellectuals that met regularly from 1981 through 1996 for seminars on a variety of topics. In January 1997, it reorganized as a web-based publication maintained by the Edge Foundation (edge.org).

It was founded as a salon by literary agent John Brockman.  He wrote books about the philosophy of science and his clients included scientific authors such as Richard Dawkins, Daniel Dennett and Steven Pinker who were the basis for the gatherings.  The title of Reality Club was a pun, as a theme was the nature of reality in the context of the clash between concepts such as post-structuralism and scientific realism.

Attendees
Isaac Asimov
Daniel Hillis
John Searle
Gerd Stern

References

External links
About The Reality Club
Reality Club Archives

Clubs and societies in New York City
Organizations established in 1981
1981 establishments in New York City
1986 disestablishments in New York (state)